Thrasymedes  of Paros was an ancient Greek sculptor. Formerly he was regarded as a pupil of Phidias because he set up in the temple of Asclepius at Epidaurus a seated chryselephantine sculpture of that deity, which was evidently a copy of the Statue of Zeus at Olympia by Phidias. An inscription found at Epidaurus yet proves that the temple and the statue belong to the 4th century BCE.

References

Attribution:

4th-century BC Greek sculptors
Ancient Greek sculptors
Ancient Parians
Epidaurus
Statue of Zeus at Olympia
Asclepius